Attila Pálizs (born April 21, 1967) is a Hungarian sprint canoeist who competed in the early 1990s. He won two medals in the C-2 500 m event at the ICF Canoe Sprint World Championships with a gold in 1991 and a bronze in 1990.

At the 1992 Summer Olympics in Barcelona, Pálizs finished fifth in the C-2 1000 m event and seventh in the C-2 500 m event.

References

1967 births
Canoeists at the 1992 Summer Olympics
Hungarian male canoeists
Living people
Olympic canoeists of Hungary
ICF Canoe Sprint World Championships medalists in Canadian
20th-century Hungarian people